Isankani (Quechua isanka basket; colander, Aymara -ni a suffix, "the one with the basket (or colander)", Hispanicized spelling Isangane) is a   mountain in the Andes of Peru. It is located in the Cusco Region, Espinar Province, on the border of the districts of Condoroma and Ocoruro. Isankani lies east of Aqhu Phichaqa.

References

Mountains of Peru
Mountains of Cusco Region